Glasgow Historic District is a national historic district located at Glasgow, Rockbridge County, Virginia. The district encompasses 43 contributing buildings, 3 contributing sites, and 1 contributing structure in the central business district of the town of Glasgow.  It includes a variety of residential, commercial, and institutional buildings dating from the 1820s to 1920s, with most structures from the 1890s.  Notable buildings include the Rebecca Salling House (c. 1920), First Baptist Church, the former Glasgow Baptist Church, St. John's Episcopal Church, Blue Ridge Building (c. 1890), and Glasgow Masonic Temple (1891-1892).

It was listed on the National Register of Historic Places in 1995, with a boundary increase in 2006.

References

Historic districts in Rockbridge County, Virginia
Colonial Revival architecture in Virginia
National Register of Historic Places in Rockbridge County, Virginia
Historic districts on the National Register of Historic Places in Virginia